High School of Electrical Engineering Sarajevo (Bosnian: Srednja elektrotehnička škola Sarajevo) is high school in Sarajevo, Bosnia and Herzegovina. It is established in 1945 and education initially lasted for three years. In 1950, the government made a law about 4-year education at this school.

Concentrations
After a long series of reforms since the establishment, the school has specialized in the following directions:

 Computing and Informatics
 Telecommunications
 Automation and Electronics
 Marketing and Communications
 Broadcasting Technology

After the first two years, students have the knowledge of "electrical technician", and later they choose one of the concentrations.

References

External links
 Official website

1945 establishments in Bosnia and Herzegovina
Educational institutions established in 1945
Secondary schools in Bosnia and Herzegovina
Education in Sarajevo
Electrical engineering departments